The enzyme 3-dehydro-L-gulonate-6-phosphate decarboxylase catalyzes the chemical reaction

3-dehydro-L-gulonate 6-phosphate + H+  L-xylulose 5-phosphate + CO2

This enzyme belongs to the family of lyases, specifically the carboxy-lyases, which cleave carbon-carbon bonds.  The systematic name of this enzyme class is 3-dehydro-L-gulonate-6-phosphate carboxy-lyase (L-xylulose-5-phosphate-forming). Other names in common use include 3-keto-L-gulonate 6-phosphate decarboxylase, UlaD, SgaH, SgbH, KGPDC, and 3-dehydro-L-gulonate-6-phosphate carboxy-lyase.  This enzyme participates in pentose and glucuronate interconversions and ascorbate and aldarate metabolism.

References 

 
 

EC 4.1.1
Enzymes of unknown structure